The Hague Convention on Celebration and Recognition of the Validity of Marriages or Hague Marriage Convention is a multilateral treaty developed by the Hague Conference on Private International Law that provides the recognition of marriages. The convention was signed in 1978 by Portugal, Luxembourg and Egypt, and later by Australia, Finland and the Netherlands. It entered into force more than 10 years after opening for signature after ratification by Australia, the Netherlands (for its European territory only) and Luxembourg, and no countries have acceded to the convention since. It replaced the 1902 Convention Governing Conflicts of Laws Concerning Marriage.

See also
Hague Conference on Private International Law
International matrimonial law

External sources
Status table of signatories and ratifications Hague Conference on Private International Law
Treaty text Hague Conference on Private International Law

References

Family law treaties
Treaties concluded in 1978
Treaties entered into force in 1991
Marriages
Treaties of Australia
Treaties of Luxembourg
Treaties of the Netherlands
Marriage law
1978 in the Netherlands
Treaties extended to Norfolk Island